Mohammad Habibur Rahman (9 October 1927 – 16 February 2004) Who was known as Comrade Pir Habibur Rahman. Bangladeshi politician and organizer of the Liberation War who was a Member of Parliament for Sylhet-3 constituency. He was a member of the East Pakistan Legislative Assembly in 1957.

Early life 
Habibur Rahman was born on 9 October 1927in the village of Bagerkhla in the Jalalpur Union of Sylhet.

Career 
Habibur joined the National Awami Party (NAP) from the Awami League in 1957 and was elected a member of the East Pakistan Legislative Assembly in a by-election to a seat in Sylhet Sadar in the same year.

He was elected Member of Parliament from Sylhet-3 constituency as a candidate of the Awami League-led 15-party alliance in the third parliamentary elections of 1986.

Death 
Habibur Rahman died on 16 February 2004.

References 

1927 births
2004 deaths
3rd Jatiya Sangsad members
People from Dakshin Surma Upazila